William Nassau Kennedy (28 April 1839 – 3 May 1885) was the second Mayor of  Winnipeg, Manitoba from 1875 – 1876.  He was the first commander of The Royal Winnipeg Rifles.

Biography
Kennedy was born in Newcastle, Upper Canada (now Newcastle, Ontario) and was the second of six children of John Kennedy, a housepainter and lieutenant-colonel in the militia, and Catharine Lambert.

Kennedy enlisted in the Peterborough Rifle Company in 1857.  He was commissioned as an ensign in 1865 and served during the Fenian Raids. In 1867, Kennedy was gazetted as a captain in the newly formed 57th Peterborough Battalion of Infantry.   In 1870 he joined the Wolseley expedition to fight the Red River Rebellion in what is now Manitoba.

He remained in Manitoba after the fighting ended.

He died in London on 3 May 1885 and was buried on the eastern side of Highgate Cemetery, almost opposite the tomb of Karl Marx.

References 

1839 births
1885 deaths
Burials at Highgate Cemetery
Mayors of Winnipeg
Canadian Militia officers

Royal Winnipeg Rifles officers
Royal Winnipeg Rifles